The AAA Mascot Tag Team Championship (Campeón Mundial Mascota AAA in Spanish) is a tag team title contested for in the Mexican lucha libre promotion AAA. The title is for teams of a regular-sized wrestler and a second miniature version, or mascot, of himself. Being a professional wrestling championship, it is not won legitimately: it is instead won via a scripted ending to a match or awarded to a wrestler because of a storyline. The titles are currently vacant after previous champions, El Alebrije and Cuije, left the AAA promotion. The first championship team was Abismo Negro and Mini Abismo Negro, although it is not clear exactly how they won the title.

Title history

Footnotes

References

Lucha Libre AAA Worldwide championships
Tag team wrestling championships
Midget wrestling championships